The Monument to the Soviet Army (Pametnik na Savetskata armia) is a monument located in Sofia, the capital of Bulgaria. There is a large park around the statue and the surrounding areas. It is a popular place where many young people gather. The monument is located on Tsar Osvoboditel Boulevard, near Orlov Most and the Sofia University. It portrays a soldier from the Soviet Army as a freedom fighter, surrounded by a Bulgarian woman, holding her baby, and a Bulgarian man. There are other, secondary sculptural composition parts of the memorial complex around the main monument, like the group of soldiers which have been used many times as a canvas by political artists. The monument was built in 1954 on the occasion of the 10th anniversary of the liberation by the Soviet Army, which is the general Russian interpretation of the complex Military history of Bulgaria during World War II.

Painting of the Monument

2011: Popart comics composition 

On June 17, 2011, the monument was painted overnight by a group of anonymous artists who call themselves Destructive Creation and who "dressed" the Soviet Army soldiers as the American popular culture characters: Superman, Joker, Robin, Captain America, Ronald McDonald, Santa Claus, Wolverine, The Mask, and Wonder Woman. A caption was painted underneath which translates as  "In pace with the times" (in Bulgarian "В крак с времето" - "V krak s vremeto").

The paint was removed three days later, in the late hours of June 20, 2011, though later it was declared that it was during the next morning. The event was widely covered by the international media, the at the beginning unknown artists were even being compared to Banksy and called "Banksy of Bulgaria".  It has provoked serious pro- and anti-Russian discussion in Bulgarian society. Meanwhile, Bulgarian Culture Minister Vezhdi Rashidov called the composition an act of vandalism.

The story was filmed in the short documentary In Step With The Time directed by Anton Partalev and includes anonymous interviews of the artists of Destructive Creation and various representatives of pro-Russian organizations in Bulgaria. The film won the second place prize in the 2013 Festiwal IN OUT (In Out Festival) in Poland.

The monument is a place that delivers an explicit message of the distribution of power, with the superheroes acting as a metaphor for the American way of life. The painting showed the state of affairs in Bulgaria, split between the traditional relationship to the Soviet Union and the modern influence of Western capitalism.

2012: Anti-ACTA  
The monument again was used as a ground of artistic expression and social stance, when on February 10, 2012, the soldiers depicted were given Anonymous Guy Fawkes masks, the photo of this was spread in Sofia and throughout Bulgaria as an invitation to anti-ACTA protests held on February 11, 2012, in Bulgaria and Europe as a whole.

Other (2012-2013) 
In addition, the monument was used as a ground for protest for the arrests of Pussy Riot in Russia, when on August 17, 2012, the soldiers were photographed with Pussy Riot masks.

On February 1, 2013, during Bulgaria's National Day for the Commemoration of the Victims of Communism, more commonly known throughout Europe as Black Ribbon Day, three of the figures of the monument were painted in white, red and green, the colours of the Bulgarian national flag.

2013: Apology for Prague '68 
On August 21, 2013, unknown artists painted the monument in pink, in honour of the anniversary of the 1968 Prague spring. There was an inscription both in Bulgarian and in Czech which read "Bulgaria apologizes". The pink colour is a reference to the painting of the Monument to Soviet Tank Crews in Prague by David Černý in 1991. On August 22, Russia officially demanded sanctions for those responsible for the monument's desecration and that Bulgaria take immediate measures to prevent such incidents in the future. Foreign Minister Kristian Vigenin asked not to dramatize the painting and stated that "Bulgaria has international commitments to maintain these monuments. Desecration of a monument is something that should not happen. I don't think that it should cause much extreme reaction on this issue, because the institutions in Bulgaria took immediate measures."

2014: "Glory to Ukraine" and "Hands off Ukraine" 
On 23 February 2014, the monument was once more painted by unknown perpetrators, this time the statue of one of the soldiers and the flag above it were painted in the national colours of Ukraine. The phrase "Glory to Ukraine" was written in Ukrainian on the monument, as well as a reference to Russian President Vladimir Putin (who was called "Kaputin", from the German kaputt, meaning broken). The act was in support of the 2014 Ukrainian Revolution. The same day a photo of the painted monument became Best of the Day in Euronews with the title: "Bulgaria: Glory to Ukraine."

On February 24, the Russian Ministry of Foreign Affairs expressed outrage, saying that "News was greeted with a feeling of deep resentment in Russia of yet another case of vandalism directed against the Soviet Army monument in the center of the capital of Bulgaria, Sofia, during the night of February 23." The Russian Ministry sent a protest note to their Bulgarian counterparts with a request to "conduct a thorough investigation of this hooligan incident and to accuse those guilty of such an unlawful conduct and also take appropriate measures to bring the memorial back to its normal state."

On March 2, the monument was painted with another inscription defending Ukraine, this time as a reaction to the invasion of Russian troops of the Crimean Peninsula. The inscription reads "Hands off Ukraine" and crosses out the dedication "for the liberator Soviet Army from the grateful Bulgarian people."

On April 12 one of the statues was painted in the colours of the Polish flag, with another one of the statues standing right behind being painted with the Ukrainian colours. Under the soldiers there is an inscription remembering about the Katyn massacre.

2022: Reaction to the invasion of Ukraine by Russia 
The monument once again got painted in the colors of the Ukrainian flag like in 2014 following the attack on Ukraine by Russian forces.

Movement for the removal of the monument 

Most Bulgarians are against the removal or demolition of the monument, while neoliberals in Bulgaria insist on its removal. The monument also has a special place as an evening gathering place of skaters, ravers, rasta and other subcultural groups around it who feel its atmosphere somewhat surrealistic or unreal.

During the vandalism event in 2011, several politicians used the attention to promote the removal of the monument. On June 29, a hearing was scheduled in Sofia, however opinions were split and there were not enough votes to support the move and approve the matter for debates.

References

External links

 3D panorama picture of the popart animation composition
 More pictures of the monument
 The Politics of Conservation - #ДАНСing and Romancing the Soviet Army Monument in Sofia
 Present Struggles with the Heroes of the Soviet Past. ‘Alyosha’ Monuments in Tallinn, Vienna, Plovdiv, and the Post-Communist Space (for a further reading about monuments and their significance)

Anonymous (hacker group)
Buildings and structures in Sofia
Bulgaria–Soviet Union relations
Graffiti and unauthorised signage
Monuments and memorials in Bulgaria
Pop art
Soviet military memorials and cemeteries
Tourist attractions in Sofia
Vandalized works of art